The Four Corners Historic District is the intersection of Broad and Market streets in Newark, New Jersey. It is the site of the city's earliest settlement and the heart of Downtown Newark that at one time was considered the busiest intersection in the United States. The area that radiates 22 square blocks from the crossroads is a state and federal historic district. Today, no Vehicle Traffic is allowed to turn at Broad and Market. Traffic heading from towards the County Courthouse towards the Intersection trying to head Southbound on Broad Street should turn Right on University Avenue, then a left on Brandford Pl. If your trying to go Northbound on Broad St, make a left on Washington St then right on Raymond. All Broad St. Traffic heading from towards Broad St. Station trying to access Market St. Eastbound traffic should take a Left on Park Pl, then right on Mulberry St. down to Market St, Same would go with Westbound Traffic, or right on Raymond Ave, then left on University.

The crossing became the center of the town soon after establishment in 1666; the home of founder Robert Treat was located at the southwest corner. During the next centuries it remained the focal point of the city which grew around it. By 1834 the United New Jersey Railroad and Canal Company had established a terminal to the south and in 1869 the Newark and New York Railroad had one to the north. During the period of massive expansion at the start of the 20th century, the district became the city's modern business district, and site of its first skyscraper built by the Firemen's Insurance Company at the southeast corner in 1910. The Newark Public Service Terminal on Broad Street opened in 1916. Though faded in its former glory, the Four Corners district remains Newark's traditional center for commerce and business and since the late 2000s (decade) the focus of much interest in revitalizing retail, residential, and restaurant activity downtown.

Broad and Market
The names and the crossing of streets named Broad and Market is seen in many of the colonial cities in New Jersey, such as Paterson and Trenton and the United States, such as Philadelphia. In Newark, Broad Street, as the name suggests, is a wide avenue which runs north to Military Park and Broad Street Station, while to the south it passes Government Center and Symphony Hall. Market Street to the east passes Gateway Center
and Newark Penn Station, while to the west are the Essex County Veterans Courthouse and the university campuses located in the city. It has long been a busy crossroad. In 1915, Public Service counted over 280,000 pedestrian crossings in one thirteen-hour period. Eleven years later, on October 26, 1926, a State Motor Vehicle Department check at the Four Corners counted 2,644 trolleys, 4,098 buses, 2,657 taxis, 3,474 commercial vehicles, and 23,571 automobiles. Between 1925 and 1939 a staffed  traffic control tower stood at the intersection.

Historic district
The historic district is one of seven in Newark. The Four Corners Historic District is roughly bounded by Raymond Boulevard, Mulberry, Hill, and Washington streets and University Avenue. The area is considered vital in the redevelopment of the city, located between city attractions, residential neighborhoods, educational and commercial institutions. In 2010, in order to promote the restoration of facades in the district the city has implemented stricter signage policy for any renovations.

The northwest quadrant of the district has been home to Prudential Headquarters since its founding. Three buildings built by the finance company, including the Gibraltar Building on Halsey Street, are found there, as is the original flagship store of the department store Bamberger's.

The city's two tallest buildings, the neoclassical National Newark and Art Deco Eleven 80, are found in the northeast quadrant near the abutting historic district of Military Park.

The southeast quadrant is home to the Kinney Building, Old First Presbyterian Church, the First National State Bank Building, the Newark and New York Railroad terminal, Newark City Hall at Government Center and historic Grace Church (Episcopal). The Prudential Center borders this section at Mulberry Street. A new hotel (Mariott Courtyard) and retail complex at Broad and Lafayette Streets is located there. Several buildings in the southeast quadrant have been renovated for residential spaces.

New construction and renovations in the neighborhood such as the mixed-use buildings, the William Flats, the approved 19-story Vibe and the planned 40-story Halo. as well as new restaurants, shops, bank, and a planned Eataly-style food marketplace. An IHOP restaurant with five floors of market rate apartments on top is under construction at the intersection of Broad and Hill streets.

Four Corners Millennium Project
In December 2012, the city council approved plans for further renovations in the district which would extend the neighborhood to Market Street that would rehabilitate former commercial buildings to residential and retail spaces. A similar proposal has been made for the former Newark Paramount movie palace. In January 2014, the Four Corners Millennium Project was awarded $52 million in New Jersey State Economic Development grants.

See also
 National Register of Historic Places listings in Essex County, New Jersey
 List of tallest buildings in Newark
 Government Center (Newark)

References

External links

Neighborhoods in Newark, New Jersey
Renaissance Revival architecture in New Jersey
Italianate architecture in New Jersey
Geography of Newark, New Jersey
Cass Gilbert buildings
National Register of Historic Places in Newark, New Jersey
Historic districts in Essex County, New Jersey
Historic districts on the National Register of Historic Places in New Jersey
New Jersey Register of Historic Places
Streets in Essex County, New Jersey
Road junctions in the United States